The Laodao River, also known as the Laotang River or Liaoxu River, is a right-bank tributary of the Xiang River, the 2nd largest tributary of Xiang River in Changsha, Hunan Province, China. It flows through Liuyang City, Changsha County, Furong and Kaifu Districts, and merges into Xiang River at Jiangwan of Xiufeng Subdistrict, Kaifu District. 

The River originates from Zhouluo Village of Shegang Town in Liuyang, and flows through Longfu Township, Shashi Town, Beisheng Town, Yong'an Town, Chuanhua Town, and Huanghua Town to join the Xiang River at Yangyou Lake.

References

External links

Rivers of Changsha